DRRA can refer to:

Tessaoua Airport (ICAO: DRRA), an airport serving Tessaoua in Niger.
Decreasing relative risk aversion in economics, finance, and decision theory
Disaster Recovery Reform Act of 2018 in the United States